The Columbia Southern Hotel, also known as the Shaniko Hotel, is a historic hotel, located in Shaniko, Oregon, United States. Built by the Columbia Southern Railway in 1900–1902 at the southern terminus of its line, the hotel was and remains the most imposing structure in Shaniko. It was the hub and focal point of the community during the heyday of the local wool industry in the early decades of the 20th century. In addition to lodging, it served as saloon, bank, stagecoach stop, dance hall, and general gathering place.

The hotel was listed on the National Register of Historic Places in 1979. In 1982 it was additionally listed as a contributing resource in the National Register-listed Shaniko Historic District.

Gallery

See also

 National Register of Historic Places listings in Wasco County, Oregon

References

Hotel buildings on the National Register of Historic Places in Oregon
Italianate architecture in Oregon
National Register of Historic Places in Wasco County, Oregon
Buildings and structures in Wasco County, Oregon
Hotel buildings completed in 1902
1902 establishments in Oregon
Individually listed contributing properties to historic districts on the National Register in Oregon